James Haldane (19 December 1890 – 27 August 1915) was a Scottish professional footballer who played in the Scottish League for Lochgelly United as an inside right. He was killed in action during the First World War.

Personal life 
At the age of 18, Haldane was working as a miner and he later served in the Territorial Army for four years. Soon after Britain's entry into the First World War, Haldane enlisted in the British Army in Glencraig. On 8 August 1914, he joined the Royal Scots as a private at Glencorse Barracks. Haldane was killed on 27 August 1915 when a working party, of which he was a member, came under German machine gun fire while digging a trench in France. He died instantly while helping to carry a wounded comrade in. Haldane was buried in Cambrin Churchyard Extension.

Career statistics

References

External links 

 

Scottish footballers
1915 deaths
British Army personnel of World War I
British military personnel killed in World War I
Lochgelly United F.C. players
Footballers from Dundee
Royal Scots soldiers
Scottish Football League players
1890 births
Association football inside forwards
Hearts of Beath F.C. players